Tekkeışıklar is a village in the Kepsut district of Balıkesir province in Turkey.

References

Villages in Kepsut District